Dennis James Sobchuk (born January 12, 1954) is a Canadian former professional ice hockey centre who played 35 games in the National Hockey League (NHL).

Early life 
Sobchuk was born in Lang, Saskatchewan. His older brother is Gene Sobchuk, also a professional hockey player. The two played together on the Cincinnati Stingers while their father, Harry Sobchuk, was the scout for the team.

Career 
During his career, Sobchuk was a member of the Detroit Red Wings and Quebec Nordiques. He also played five seasons in the World Hockey Association (WHA) with the Phoenix Roadrunners, Cincinnati Stingers and Edmonton Oilers.

His jersey number 14 is one of six numbers retired by the Regina Pats of the Western Hockey League (WHL).

Career statistics

Regular season and playoffs

Awards
 WCHL Second All-Star Team – 1972
 WCHL All-Star Team – 1974

External links

Dennis Sobchuk bio at The Summit in 1974

1954 births
Living people
Adirondack Red Wings players
Birmingham Bulls (CHL) players
Canadian ice hockey centres
Cincinnati Stingers players
Detroit Red Wings players
Edmonton Oilers (WHA) players
Estevan Bruins players
Fredericton Express players
Ice hockey people from Saskatchewan
Moncton Alpines (AHL) players
Philadelphia Flyers draft picks
Phoenix Roadrunners (WHA) players
Quebec Nordiques players
Regina Pats coaches
Regina Pats players
Weyburn Red Wings players
Canadian expatriate ice hockey players in the United States
Canadian ice hockey coaches